James Brady Murray (July 4, 1920 – January 2, 2015) was an American businessman and politician who served in the Virginia House of Delegates.

Early life 
Murray was born in Allenhurst, Monmouth, New Jersey. His parents were Marie and Thomas E Murray Jr. He attended Yale University, graduating in 1943. He also served in the Navy in World War II.

Politics 
He was a member of the Virginia House of Delegates for the 26th district, serving from 1974 to 1982. Then, he represented the 24th district from 1982 to 1983.

He ran for reelection in the 58th district in 1982, but lost to George Allen by 25 votes out of nearly 14,000 cast.

Personal 
He married Jean Brundred. He was a farmer and conservationist in Virginia. He died at his home in Earlysville, Virginia in 2015.

References

External links 
 

|-

1920 births
2015 deaths
Democratic Party members of the Virginia House of Delegates
People from Allenhurst, New Jersey
20th-century American politicians